"A Long and Lasting Love" is a song written by Gerry Goffin and Michael Masser and first recorded by Jane Olivor on her 1980 album, The Best Side of Goodbye.  The following year, Billy Preston and Syreeta recorded it on their 1981 album, Billy Preston & Syreeta.  The song is best known from the cover recorded by American country music artist Crystal Gayle.  It was released in August 1985 as the second single from the album Nobody Wants to Be Alone.  The song reached number 5 on the Billboard Hot Country Singles & Tracks chart.

Chart performance

Other cover versions
 Glenn Medeiros covered this song with some changes in lyrics and entitled, "Long and Lasting Love".
 Cantopop artist Vivian Chow also covered this song in her native Cantonese, retaining the "A Long and Lasting Love" line in English.

References

External links
 

1985 singles
Billy Preston songs
Crystal Gayle songs
Songs written by Michael Masser
Songs with lyrics by Gerry Goffin
Warner Records singles
Pop ballads
Country ballads
1980 songs
1980s ballads